Paoli (/peɪ̯ˈoʊ̯.lʌ/) is a town in Garvin County, Oklahoma, United States. The population was 610 at the 2010 census. It was named after Paoli, Pennsylvania, an unincorporated community near Philadelphia from which many of the railroad workers who built the town came.

History
A post office was established at Paoli, Indian Territory on June 27, 1888.  It took its name from Paoli, Pennsylvania.  At the time of its founding, Paoli was located in Pickens County, Chickasaw Nation.
At one time was home to Michael Driskell who, once punched a hole in a bear just to see what was coming down the road.

Geography
Paoli is located in northern Garvin County at  (34.826997, -97.261132).

US 77 leads north  to Purcell and south  to Pauls Valley, the Garvin County seat.

Demographics

As of the census of 2000, there were 649 people, 247 households, and 189 families residing in the town. There were 268 housing units at an average density of 894.0 per square mile (344.9/km2). The racial makeup of the town was 87.21% White, 7.70% Native American, 0.92% from other races, and 4.16% from two or more races. Hispanic or Latino of any race were 2.62% of the population.

There were 247 households, out of which 36.8% had children under the age of 18 living with them, 57.5% were married couples living together, 14.6% had a female householder with no husband present, and 23.1% were non-families. 21.9% of all households were made up of individuals, and 14.2% had someone living alone who was 65 years of age or older. The average household size was 2.63 and the average family size was 3.05.

In the town, the population was spread out, with 27.6% under the age of 18, 11.2% from 18 to 24, 27.9% from 25 to 44, 19.6% from 45 to 64, and 13.7% who were 65 years of age or older. The median age was 35 years. For every 100 females, there were 96.1 males. For every 100 females age 18 and over, there were 85.8 males.

The median income for a household in the town was $30,139, and the median income for a family was $33,625. Males had a median income of $25,750 versus $17,153 for females. The per capita income for the town was $13,512. About 9.6% of families and 14.6% of the population were below the poverty line, including 19.4% of those under age 18 and 7.3% of those age 65 or over.

The Paoli High School mascot is a pug.

References

External links
 Paoli Public Schools

Towns in Garvin County, Oklahoma
Towns in Oklahoma